Big Boli Star is an Indian talent hunt contest aimed at promoting Punjabi boliyan, a traditional Punjabi folk art. The first season of the show saw popular names like Pammi Bai, Master Saleem, Gurmeet Bawa, Raj Brar, Gulrej Akhtar, Kulvinder Kelly, Kolaveri D Punjabi Boys as judges. The show was aired on Reliance Broadcast Network Limited’s regional general entertainment channel for the Punjab, Haryana, Chandigarh, and Himachal Pradesh (PHCHP) region, Spark Punjabi in 2012.

The on-ground auditions were hosted from March to May 2012 across cities like Amritsar, Jalandhar, Ludhiana, Patiala, Chandigarh and Jammu with over 300 participants from each city. The show includes elements like musical performances, folk dances and an emotion-filled atmosphere along the way which creates a strong build up to the race for the top 2 and finally the "Big Boli Star".

The popularity of the Big Boli Star created a new wave of enthusiasm towards highlighting traditional Punjabi culture while bringing young new talent to the forefront.

The series was presented by Reliance Broadcast Network’s leading media platforms of the PHCHP (Punjab, Haryana, Chandigarh, Himachal Pradesh) – Spark Punjabi and 92.7 BIG FM – both leaders, in their respective genres, and with a superlative combined reach and was marketed across RBNL platforms.

Televised over 14 episodes, the show went on-air on 3 June 2012 every Saturday and Sunday at 9 PM on Spark Punjabi.

Finalists

References

External links
 "Final Result Link", December 18,2012
 "Chandigarh Result Link", December 18,2012
 "Jammu Result Link", December 18,2012
 "Amritsar Result Link", December 18,2012
 "Ludhiana Result Link", December 18,2012

Talent shows
Indian reality television series
Punjabi-language television shows
2012 Indian television series debuts
2012 Indian television series endings
Song contests